Óscar Fernando Salinas Aguilar (born 26 June 1988) is a Chilean footballer that currently plays for Deportes Temuco in the Chilean Primera División.

Honours

Club
Deportes Melipilla
 Primera B: 2006

Unión Temuco
 Tercera División: 2009

Individual
 Tercera División Top-scorer (2): 2009, 2011
 Amateur Footballer of the Year (1): 2009

External links
 
 

1988 births
Living people
Chilean footballers
Chilean expatriate footballers
Primera B de Chile players
Chilean Primera División players
Tercera División de Chile players
Bolivian Primera División players
Cobresal footballers
Coquimbo Unido footballers
C.D. Antofagasta footballers
Unión Temuco footballers
Deportes Iberia footballers
Deportes Melipilla footballers
Everton de Viña del Mar footballers
Deportes Iquique footballers
Oriente Petrolero players
Association football forwards
Association football wingers
Chilean expatriate sportspeople in Bolivia
Expatriate footballers in Bolivia